Bernhard Kammerer (born 21 March 1962) is an Italian luger. He competed in the men's doubles event at the 1988 Winter Olympics.

References

External links
 

1962 births
Living people
Italian male lugers
Olympic lugers of Italy
Lugers at the 1988 Winter Olympics
People from Kiens
Sportspeople from Südtirol